Sooty is a British children's television franchise, set around a puppet character of the same name.

Sooty may also refer to:
 Sooty (2001 TV series), a 2001–2004 British children's series, created for the Sooty franchise.
 Sooty (2011 TV series), a 2011 British children's series, created for the Sooty franchise.
 Sooty (gene), trait characterized by black or darker hairs mixed into a horse's coat
 Sooty Jones (20th century), bass guitarist

See also

 Soot (disambiguation)